The Forgotten is a 2003 American Korea War film directed by Vincente Stasolla and starring Randy Ryan. The majority of the film was shot in Pennsylvania. The film chronicles the story of two tanks that get lost behind enemy lines in the beginning of the Korean War. Facing the crew is an inexperienced commander, the mounting tension between a motley assortment of soldiers, and the general confusion of the "forgotten war" itself.

Plot
In October 1950, during a decimating North Korean Army assault, a U.S. Army tank platoon retreats. The remaining two tanks become lost behind enemy lines. Corporal William Byrne, an idealistic, God-fearing young enlistee, becomes the platoon commander after the platoon sergeant dies. Fighting against the unseen enemy and waning esprit de corps, the tanks crisscross the unfamiliar Korean landscape. Death, dissension, and a wounded North Korean PoW test the wills of Cpl. Byrne and crews. Meanwhile, struggling to maintain his faith, Cpl. Byrne escapes the war by remembering his wife and the delusions of his morphine-medicated mind.

Cast
Randy Ryan – Corp. William Byrne
David McMahan – Pv. Jake O'Brian
Salim Rahman – Pvt. Philip Cook
Stephen Kilcullen – Pvt. George Packs
Malcolm Barrett – Pvt. Michael Anderson
B. Ouyang – Jong Soo Kim
Janan Raouf – Mrs. Elizabeth Byrne
Christopher Benson Reed – Sgt. Moore

Awards
The Forgotten received several awards, namely "Best Feature" at the Sedona Film Festival, "Grand Jury Selection", and "Best Narrative Feature" at the Artfest Film Festival.

Production
Writer/Producer Vincente Stasolla has stated that there were several reasons for making The Forgotten. One was the importance of shedding light on the Korean War itself. Though historians consider this particular war less understood and less well-remembered than other wars, its cost in human terms is undisputed:

Stasolla had a personal connection with the war, as his uncle had served. And, he was influenced by seminal filmmakers like Samuel Fuller (The Steel Helmet and Fixed Bayonets), who was well known for making limited budget war movies. David Lean (The Bridge Over the River Kwai) and Terrence Malick (The Thin Red Line) also influenced Stasolla.

See also
 List of American films of 2004
 Twist ending

References

External links
 
 
 

2003 films
2000s war drama films
American war drama films
2000s English-language films
2000s American films